Martin Kližan was the defending champion but lost in the quarterfinals to Tomáš Berdych.

Jo-Wilfried Tsonga won the title, defeating David Goffin in the final, 4–6, 6–4, 6–1.

Seeds

Draw

Finals

Top half

Bottom half

Qualifying

Seeds

Qualifiers

Lucky loser
  Denis Istomin

Qualifying draw

First qualifier

Second qualifier

Third qualifier

Fourth qualifier

References
 Main draw
 Qualifying draw

Singles